Uthumphon Phisai is a district (amphoe) in the western part of Sisaket province, lower northeastern Thailand.

Geography
Neighboring districts are (from the north clockwise): Rasi Salai, Mueang Sisaket, Wang Hin, Prang Ku, Huai Thap Than, Mueang Chan, Pho Si Suwan, and Bueng Bun.

History
The district dates back to Mueang Uthumphon Phisai, which was converted into a district in 1911, then named Phachim Sisaket (ปจิมศีร์ษะเกษ). In 1913 it was renamed Uthomphon Phisai again. The district office was in Ban Samrong Yai, tambon Samrong.

Administration
The district is divided into 19 sub-districts (tambons), which are further subdivided into 232 villages (mubans). Kamphaeng is a township (thesaban tambon) which covers parts of tambon Kamphaeng. There are a further 19 tambon administrative organizations (TAO).

Missing numbers are tambons which now form the districts Mueang Chan and Pho Si Suwan.

Places
Uthumphon Phisai is the home of Prasat Sa Kamphaeng Yai, the biggest Khmer-styled Hindu temple in the province.

Wat Pa Si Mongkhon Rattanaram is a Thai Buddhist temple in Theravāda sect. This temple is famous for its beautiful and fantasy Nāga cave and a white Buddha statue enshrined within. 

Since January 2019 onwards every Friday evening, locals will join to close the road in Kamphaeng to make a cultural pedestrian street named Talat Ban Kao Hao Tamyae. Considered as a local flea market that collects various interesting products and many food.

Notable people
Srisaket Sor Rungvisai: two times WBC super flyweight world champion

Local food
Kai yang mai madan: a Thai grilled chicken that uses madan (มะดัน, Garcinia schomburgkiana) skewers while grilling causing the chicken to have a sour smell from grilled wood, therefore makes it different from grilled chicken in other places. Its origin is in neighboring district Huai Thap Than. Hence the name Kai yang Huai Thap Than in other way.
Cricket ho mok
Frog ho mok
Khao chi: sticky rice, roll it into an oval and put on the hot charcoal fire along with brushing with eggs.

References

External links
amphoe.com

Uthumphon Phisai